The following is a list of sanctuaries in Silesia.

In the last 20 years there has been a noticeable increase in the pilgrimage movement in Poland, triggered by the papacy of John Paul II. The main sanctuary of Poland is the Pauline Monastery on Jasna Góra in Częstochowa. Millions of pilgrims from Poland and all over the world make their way there every year. There are also many other sacred places which people can visit:

Piekary Slaskie
Dabrowa Gornicza
Katowice Bogucice
Katowice Panewniki
Mstow
Myszkow Mrzyglod
Pszow
Skoczow
Turza
Żarki Lesniow

External links
 travel guide

Christianity in Poland
Silesia